HNK Orašje is a professional association football club from the town of Orašje that is situated in Bosnia and Herzegovina. The club was founded in 1996, being one of the newest to play in the Premier League of Bosnia and Herzegovina. Orašje plays its home matches on the Gradski Stadion ("City Stadium"), which has a capacity of 3,000 seats. The team's colours are red and white. The club currently plays in the First League of the Federation of Bosnia and Herzegovina.

After winning the Bosnian cup competition in 2006, they secured a place in the UEFA Cup for the first time in their history. They were kicked out in the first preliminary round after two matches with Slovenian side NK Domžale. The Cup title of 2006 is their only big result so far. The fans of the club are known as the Red Warriors.

Honours

Domestic

League
First League of the Federation of Bosnia and Herzegovina
Runners-up (1): 2009–10
Second League of the Federation of Bosnia and Herzegovina
Winners (1): 2012–13

Cups
Bosnia and Herzegovina Cup
Winners (1): 2005–06
Runners-up (1): 1997–98
Herzeg-Bosnia Cup
Winners (2): 1997–98, 1999–2000
Runners-up (1): 1996–97

European record

Summary

Source: uefa.com, Last updated on 5 July 2013Pld = Matches played; W = Matches won; D = Matches drawn; L = Matches lost; GF = Goals for; GA = Goals against. Defunct competitions indicated in italics.

By season

References

External links
Official Website of HNK Orašje 

 
Association football clubs established in 1996
Orasje
Orasje
Sport in the Federation of Bosnia and Herzegovina
Orašje
1996 establishments in Yugoslavia